The 1988 Tel Aviv Open was a men's tennis tournament played on outdoor hard courts that was part of the 1988 Nabisco Grand Prix. It was played at the Israel Tennis Centers in the Tel Aviv District city of Ramat HaSharon, Israel from October 10 through October 17, 1988. First-seeded Brad Gilbert won the singles title.

Finals

Singles

 Brad Gilbert defeated  Aaron Krickstein 4–6, 7–6, 6–2
 It was Gilbert's only singles title of the year and the 12th of his career.

Doubles

 Roger Smith /  Paul Wekesa defeated  Patrick Baur /  Alexander Mronz 6–3, 6–3
 It was Smith's only title of the year and the 1st of his career. It was Wekesa's only title of the year and the 1st of his career.

References

External links
 ITF tournament edition details